They All Kissed the Bride is a 1942 American screwball comedy film directed by Alexander Hall and starring Joan Crawford and Melvyn Douglas.

The plot follows a trucking firm executive who falls in love.

Crawford took over the title role after Carole Lombard died in a plane crash in early 1942. Crawford donated all of her pay for this film to the American Red Cross.

Cast
 Joan Crawford as Margaret "M.J." Drew
 Melvyn Douglas as Michael Holmes
 Roland Young as Marsh
 Billie Burke as Mrs. Drew
 Allen Jenkins as Johnny Johnson
 Andrew Tombes as Crane
 Helen Parrish as Vivian Drew
 Emory Parnell as Mahoney
 Mary Treen as Susie Johnson
 Nydia Westman as Secretary
 Ivan F. Simpson as Dr. Cassell
 Roger Clark as Stephen Pettingill
 Edward Gargan as Private policeman

Production
They All Kissed the Bride was originally slated to star Carole Lombard in a follow-up film to the successful To Be or Not to Be.  However, she died in a 1942 plane crash after departing Las Vegas on her way back from a bond-selling tour. MGM ‘s Louis B. Mayer agreed to place Crawford on loan to Columbia, where producer Edward Kaufman had to rework the script to fit Crawford's style of comedy. In fact, Mayer rarely lent out stars of Crawford's stature, not wanting other studios to profit from MGM's star-making machine. Crawford insisted that Melvyn Douglas (with whom she had appeared in 1938's The Shining Hour and 1941's A Woman's Face) star opposite her.

Home video
As of 2020, They All Kissed the Bride and Letty Lynton are the only two major Joan Crawford sound motion pictures that have never officially been released onto DVD in the US, although They All Kissed the Bride was released onto VHS nearly 25 years prior as a Columbia Classics title.

References

External links 
 
 
 
 

1942 films
1940s screwball comedy films
American screwball comedy films
American black-and-white films
Columbia Pictures films
Films directed by Alexander Hall
1942 comedy films
1940s English-language films
1940s American films